Hengan International Group Company Limited is the largest producer of sanitary napkins and baby diapers in China. It produces sanitary napkin products, disposable baby diapers, adult diapers, and other personal hygiene products.

The company was founded in 1985 by Sze Man Bok (chairman) and Hui Lin Chit (deputy chairman and chief executive officer). It was listed on the Hong Kong Stock Exchange in 1998.

References

External links
 

Companies listed on the Hong Kong Stock Exchange
Chinese companies established in 1985
Companies based in Fujian
Chinese brands
Privately held companies of China
Manufacturing companies of China
Feminine hygiene brands